Lukas "Harry" Aurednik (20 February 1918 – 2 June 1997) was an international Austrian football player and football manager.

He coached AEK Athens F.C., Pierikos F.C., 1. Wiener Neustädter SC, Royal Charleroi SC.
From 1963 to 1965 he managed Anorthosis Famagusta in Cyprus, winning the Cypriot Cup in 1964.

Honours

As a player
Austrian Football Bundesliga (2):
 1938, 1946, 1949, 1950, 1953
Austrian Cup (1):
 1938, 1949

As a manager
 Cypriot Cup
 1963–64

References

External links

Rapid stats - Rapid Archive
Player profile - Austria Archive

1918 births
1997 deaths
Footballers from Vienna
AEK Athens F.C. managers
Pierikos F.C. managers
Austrian footballers
Austria international footballers
SK Rapid Wien players
TuS Koblenz players
FK Austria Wien players
RC Lens players
Le Havre AC players
Ligue 1 players
Ligue 2 players
Austrian Football Bundesliga players
Austrian expatriate footballers
Expatriate footballers in France
Austrian football managers
1. Wiener Neustädter SC managers
Panetolikos F.C. managers
CO Roubaix-Tourcoing players
Association football forwards